Chequiaraju, Chequiarajo, or Checquiacraju (possibly from Quechua, chiqlla green, rahu snow, ice, mountain with snow) is a mountain in the Cordillera Blanca in the Andes of Peru, about  high. It is situated in the Ancash Region, Carhuaz Province, Shilla District. Chequiaraju lies northwest of Hualcán and the lake Chiqllaqucha.

References

Mountains of Peru
Mountains of Ancash Region
Glaciers of Peru